Rugėnai (formerly) is a village in Kėdainiai district municipality, in Kaunas County, in central Lithuania. According to the 2011 census, the village had a population of 19 people. There is a fire brigade.

History
Rugėnai has been known since 1597. It was a selsovet center during 1950–1954. There was a primary school in 1920–1980.

Demography

References

Villages in Kaunas County
Kėdainiai District Municipality